Montgomery is a residential neighbourhood in the northwest quadrant of Calgary, Alberta.  Its boundaries are Shaganappi Trail to the east, 32nd Avenue and Market Mall to the north, and the Bow River to the south and west. Immediately across the river to the west is the community of Bowness, itself a town until being annexed by Calgary in 1964.

Montgomery was originally established as a community in 1911. In 1943, it was renamed to Montgomery, named after Field Marshal Bernard Law Montgomery, 1st Viscount Montgomery of Alamein, a celebrated British military leader who played an important role in World War I and World War II. On December 24, 1957, Montgomery incorporated as a town, but changed to village status less than four months later on April 15, 1958.  The village was eventually absorbed by the City of Calgary on August 15, 1963, via amalgamation.

Montgomery is represented in the Calgary City Council by the Ward 1 councillor. The community has an area redevelopment plan in place.

Demographics

Residents in this community had a median household income of $42,795 in 2000, and there were 24.7% low income residents living in the neighbourhood. As of 2000, 18.7% of the residents were immigrants. A proportion of 11.4% of the buildings were condominiums or apartments, and 32.8% of the housing was used for renting.

Education
Terrace Road Elementary public school is located in this community. Foundations for the Future Charter School now occupies the former Montgomery Junior High School.

See also 
List of former urban municipalities in Alberta

References

External links
 The Montgomery Community Association

Calgary Region
Neighbourhoods in Calgary